Tete! is an album by pianist Tete Montoliu's Trio recorded in 1974 and released on the Danish label, SteepleChase.

Reception

Scott Yanow of AllMusic called it "a typically excellent date.".

Track listing
 "Giant Steps" (John Coltrane) - 6:31 		
 "Theme for Ernie" (Fred Lacey) - 7:14
 "Body and Soul" (Frank Eyton, Johnny Green, Edward Heyman, Robert Sour) - 12:22 		
 "Solar" (Miles Davis) - 7:00
 "I Remember Clifford" (Benny Golson) - 8:26
 "Hot House" (Tadd Dameron) - 7:00

Personnel
Tete Montoliu – piano
Niels-Henning Ørsted Pedersen - bass
Albert Heath - drums

References

Tete Montoliu albums
1975 albums
SteepleChase Records albums